Mochau is a village and a former municipality in Wittenberg district in Saxony-Anhalt, Germany. Since 1 January 2009, it is part of the town Wittenberg.

Geography
Mochau lies about 7 km north of Lutherstadt Wittenberg in the Fläming.

Economy and transportation
Federal Highway (Bundesstraße) B 2 between Wittenberg and Berlin is about 2 km to the east.

Former municipalities in Saxony-Anhalt
Wittenberg